Zakhmet may refer to:
Zähmet, a town in Turkmenistan
Khachpar, Armenia, formerly Zakhmet